Heysel or Heizel is an area in Brussels and may in particular refer to:
 Heysel Plateau, a part of Brussels
 Heysel/Heizel metro station, one of the metro stations on line 6 (formerly 1A) of the Brussels Metro
 Heysel Stadium, see King Baudouin Stadium
 Heysel Stadium disaster of May 29, 1985